Langley railway station is in Langley, a suburb of Slough, Berkshire, England. The station is served by local services operated by the Elizabeth line.

History
The station is on the original line of the Great Western Railway which opened on 4 June 1838, but the station at Langley was not opened until 1845. The station building dates from 1878.

From 1 March 1883, the station was served by District Railway services running between Mansion House and Windsor. The service was discontinued as uneconomic after 30 September 1885.

Adjacent to the station is the site of the former Langley Oil Terminal, last operated by EWS.

The operation of the station was transferred to MTR Crossrail on behalf of Transport for London at the end of 2017.

From 19 December 2019, the train services became part of TfL Rail in preparation for the Elizabeth line, which the services switched to on the 24th May 2022.

Accidents and incidents 
On 1 March 1937, a passenger train and a freight train collided at Langley. One person was killed and six were injured.

Services
The station is served by local services operated by the Elizabeth line.

Frequency
The typical off-peak service is:

 4tph to 

Trains are formed of Class 345 Aventra trains with nine cars. Because the platforms are shorter than the trains, the doors in the last carriage and the last two doors in the eighth carriage do not open.

Future 
Network Rail is developing plans for the Western Rail Approach to Heathrow. This is a new rail link to provide a direct service to the airport from Reading and Slough. The new line is proposed to leave the Great Western main line just east of Langley, connecting by tunnel to existing platforms at Heathrow's Terminal 5 station.

References

Railway stations in Berkshire
Former Great Western Railway stations
Railway stations in Great Britain opened in 1845
Great Western Main Line
Transport in Slough
Railway stations served by the Elizabeth line